Márton Bukovi (10 December 1903 – 2 February 1985) was a Hungarian association football player and manager. After playing for Ferencvárosi TC, FC Sète and Hungary he became a coach, most notably with Građanski Zagreb, MTK Hungária, Olympiacos and Hungary. Together with Béla Guttmann and Gusztáv Sebes, he formed a trio of innovative Hungarian coaches who pioneered the 4–2–4 formation.

Career
Bukovi began his coaching career with Građanski Zagreb in 1935, and subsequently guided the club to two Yugoslav and two Croatian league titles. After the Second World War, Građanski was banned and replaced with Dinamo Zagreb and Bukovi remained on as manager of the new club. In 1947 Bukovi was appointed manager of MTK Hungária FC. In 1949 when Hungary became a communist state, MTK were taken over by the secret police, the ÁVH, and subsequently the club became known as Textiles SE. They then became Bástya SE, then Vörös Lobogó SE and then finally back to MTK.  Despite this turmoil, the 1950s proved a successful era for the club and with a team that included Péter Palotás, Nándor Hidegkuti, Mihály Lantos and József Zakariás, Bukovi guided them to three Hungarian League titles and a Hungarian Cup.

In Olympiacos Bukovi became a legend for the fans, and wrote history in Greek football by gaining 12 consecutive victories. He transformed Olympiacos and produced many young Greek players. Eventually he was forced to leave the club after a string of poor results in the 1967–68 season but mainly because of the military regime, labeled as a communist. He was forced to resign on 12 December 1967 and left Greece along with his assistant coach Mihály Lantos on 21 December 1967.

Bukovi also played a major role in the success of the legendary Hungary team known as the Mighty Magyars. It was Bukovi, working at MTK with Péter Palotás and Nándor Hidegkuti, who developed the vital 4-2-4 formation, later adopted by national coach Gusztáv Sebes and exported to Brazil by Béla Guttmann. This formation involved the use of either Palotás or Hidegkuti as a deep lying centre-forward. In 1953 Hidegkuti would exploit this position to great effect as he scored a hat-trick for Hungary when they beat England 6-3 at Wembley Stadium. During the Mighty Magyar era, Bukovi also worked as an assistant to Sebes and in March 1956, when the latter was sacked as national coach, he succeeded him.  On 23 September 1956 he coached a Hungary team that included Gyula Grosics, József Bozsik, Sándor Kocsis, Nándor Hidegkuti, Ferenc Puskás and Zoltán Czibor to a 1–0 victory over the USSR at the Lenin Stadium. This was the first time the USSR had lost at home.

Honours

Player

FC Sète 34

 Ligue 1: 1
1934
 French Cup: 1
1934

Ferencvárosi TC

 Hungarian Champions: 4
1926, 1927, 1928, 1932
 Hungarian Cup: 3
1927, 1928, 1933
 Mitropa Cup: 1
1928

Manager

Građanski Zagreb

 Yugoslav Champions: 2
1937, 1940
 Croatian Champions: 1
 1943

MTK/Textiles/Bástya/Vörös Lobogó

Hungarian Champions: 3
1951, 1953, 1958
Hungarian Cup: 1
1952

Olympiacos F.C.
Greek Champions: 2
1966, 1967

Sources
Behind The Curtain - Travels in Eastern European Football: Jonathan Wilson (2006) Behind the Curtain: Travels in Football in Eastern Europe

References

External links
 List of Hungarian Internationals
Puskás on Puskás Rogan Taylor and Klara Jamrich (1998)
 Hungary national football team managers
 Hungary V USSR, 1956

1903 births
1985 deaths
Footballers from Budapest
Hungarian footballers
Hungary international footballers
Hungarian expatriate footballers
Expatriate footballers in Italy
A.S. Roma players
Hungarian expatriate sportspeople in Italy
Ferencvárosi TC footballers
Expatriate footballers in France
FC Sète 34 players
Ligue 1 players
Hungarian expatriate sportspeople in France
Hungarian football managers
Hungarian expatriate football managers
HŠK Građanski Zagreb managers
Expatriate football managers in Croatia
Expatriate football managers in Yugoslavia
Hungarian expatriate sportspeople in Croatia
GNK Dinamo Zagreb managers
MTK Budapest FC managers
Újpest FC managers
Hungary national football team managers
Diósgyőri VTK managers
Expatriate football managers in Greece
Olympiacos F.C. managers
Hungarian expatriate sportspeople in Greece
S.S. Alba-Audace Roma players
Association football defenders